Born In a Storm is the debut studio album by Dutch singer-songwriter Douwe Bob. It was released in the Netherlands on 3 May 2013, through Rodeomedia.nl. The album has peaked to number 7 on the Dutch Albums Chart. The album includes the singles "Multicoloured Angels", "Stone Into the River" and "You Don't Have to Stay".

Singles
"Multicoloured Angels" was released as the lead single from the album on 21 September 2012. The song peaked to number 4 on the Dutch Singles Chart. "Blind Man's Bluff" was released as the second single from the album on 24 January 2013. "Stone Into the River" was released as the third single from the album on 19 December 2013. The song peaked to number 78 on the Dutch Singles Chart. "You Don't Have to Stay" was released as the fourth single from the album on 15 April 2014.

Track listing

Chart performance

Weekly charts

Release history

References

2013 debut albums
Douwe Bob albums